Miguel Sebastián "Pitu" Garcia (born 27 January 1984), sometimes known as just "Pitu", is an Argentine former professional footballer who played as a  midfielder.

Club career

Argentina
Pitu was born in Santa Fe. He started his career in Unión de Santa Fe, base in his hometown, from which he was loaned firstly to Palestino and subsequently to Iraklis. After being released by Unión de Santa Fe he played for a brief period for Aris in the Greek Superleague, before returning on a free transfer to Iraklis during the 2010 winter transfer window.

Iraklis
Pitu joined Iraklis on loan during the summer of 2007. He made his league debut for his new club in a match against Atromitos for the fifth round of the 2007–08 season, replacing Giannis Papadopoulos in the 56th minute of the match. He continued to appear regularly for the club until the end of the season and he even managed to score his first goal for Iraklis, in a match against OFI. It was a crucial, match deciding, goal, scored in the injury time of the match, disengaging Iraklis from the relegation battle. In the end of the season he counted 1 goal out of 20 league appearances.

Aris
On 31 August 2009, Pitu signed for Aris on a free transfer. He made his debut for Aris in a 1–1 away draw against Panthrakikos, as he replaced his teammate Neto in the 76th minute. Pitu scored his only goal for Aris in a cup match against Aspropyrgos. He contributed in Aris' campaign as, in a match against AEL, he hit the corner by which his teammate Sebastian Abreu scored the equaliser for his team. He managed to appear in total of 10 matches for Aris before being released by the club on 1 February 2010.

Iraklis
On the very same day of his release Pitu signed a contract with former club Iraklis. The debut in this second spell for Iraklis was made in a local derby match against PAOK that ended 1–1. Until the end of the season he featured in a total of ten games for Iraklis.

Atromitos
Following the Iraklis's relegation, he joined Greek First Division side Atromitos on 29 June 2011, signing a two-year contract.

PAS Giannina
On 5 August 2019, Pitu signed for PAS Giannina on a free transfer. He appeared in total of 9 matches, 7 in the championship and 2 in the Greek Cup. After the end of a match against Levadiakos, he announced his decision to retire from football.

Honours 
PAS Giannina

 Super League Greece 2: 2019–20

References

External links
 
 

1984 births
Living people
Footballers from Santa Fe, Argentina
Association football midfielders
Argentine footballers
Argentine expatriate footballers
Aris Thessaloniki F.C. players
Iraklis Thessaloniki F.C. players
Club Deportivo Palestino footballers
Unión de Santa Fe footballers
Atromitos F.C. players
Volos N.F.C. players
PAS Giannina F.C. players
Seongnam FC players
Super League Greece players
K League 1 players
Expatriate footballers in Chile
Expatriate footballers in Greece
Expatriate footballers in South Korea
Argentine expatriate sportspeople in South Korea